Annouck Curzillat (born 12 May 1992) is a French Paralympic triathlete. At the 2020 Summer Paralympics, she won a bronze medal in the Women's PTVI event.

References

External links
 
 

1992 births
Living people
French female triathletes
Paratriathletes of France
Paralympic bronze medalists for France
Paralympic medalists in paratriathlon
Paratriathletes at the 2020 Summer Paralympics
Medalists at the 2020 Summer Paralympics
21st-century French women